In mathematics, a partially ordered space (or pospace) is a topological space  equipped with a closed partial order , i.e. a partial order whose graph  is a closed subset of .

From pospaces, one can define dimaps, i.e. continuous maps between pospaces which preserve the order relation.

Equivalences 

For a topological space  equipped with a partial order , the following are equivalent:
  is a partially ordered space.
The order topology is a special case of this definition, since a total order is also a partial order.

Properties 

Every pospace is a Hausdorff space. If we take equality  as the partial order, this definition becomes the definition of a Hausdorff space.

See also

References

External links

 ordered space on Planetmath

Topological spaces